Calathus pirazzolii is a species of ground beetle from the Platyninae subfamily that is endemic to Italy.

References

pirazzolii
Beetles described in 1873
Endemic fauna of Italy
Beetles of Europe